Rylander is a surname. Notable people with this surname include:

Amanda Rylander (1832–1920), Swedish stage actress
Carole Keeton Rylander (born 1939), American politician
H. Grady Rylander (1921–2010), American mechanical engineer
Hans Christian Rylander (born 1939), Danish painter
Ragnar Rylander (1935–2016), Swedish environmental health researcher